Tatyana Talysheva (born 15 October 1937) is a Soviet athlete who competed mainly in the Long Jump.

Talysheva trained at Dynamo in Moscow. She competed for USSR in the 1968 Summer Olympics held in Mexico City, Mexico in the Long Jump where she won the bronze medal.

External links
 Sports Reference

1937 births
Russian female long jumpers
Soviet female long jumpers
Dynamo sports society athletes
Olympic bronze medalists for the Soviet Union
Athletes (track and field) at the 1964 Summer Olympics
Athletes (track and field) at the 1968 Summer Olympics
Olympic athletes of the Soviet Union
Living people
Medalists at the 1968 Summer Olympics
Olympic bronze medalists in athletics (track and field)